Denkendorf may refer to two municipalities in Germany:

Denkendorf, Baden-Württemberg
Denkendorf, Bavaria